Dactyloceras karinae is a moth in the family Brahmaeidae. It was described by Thierry Bouyer in 2002. It is found in Cameroon.

References

Endemic fauna of Cameroon
Brahmaeidae
Moths described in 2002